Russian Government Cup 1992 was played in Krasnojarsk during the period 28 January-2 February 1992. Sweden won the tournament.

This was the first time the Russia national bandy team played, and the last time the Commonwealth of Independent States national bandy team played.

The tournament began with a group stage and then had a knock-out stage to decide the final winner, with the teams losing in the semi-finals playing a third place consolation game. There was also a game for fifth place between the two teams coming in last in the group stage.

Results of the group stage

Knock-out stage

Semifinals
 -  5-3
 -  5-6

Match for fifth place
  Khakassia  -  4-2

Match for third place
 -  9-0

Final
 -  7-3

Sources
 Norway's men's internationals in bandy
 Sweden-Sovjet in bandy
 Rossijaturneringen

1992 in Russian sport
1992 in bandy
1992
January 1992 sports events in Russia
February 1992 sports events in Russia